George Stephen Nason was an Anglican priest.  He was born on 30 March 1901 and  educated at Shrewsbury and Pembroke College, Cambridge. Ordained in 1927 he was a Curate at St Luke’s Battersea followed by a period as  Rector of Bamford. He then served his country during World War II  as a Chaplain in the RNVR after which he was Dean of Gibraltar. Returning to England in 1950 he became Vicar of St Alphege’s Church, Greenwich, Rural Dean of Greenwich and Deptford, following which he was Vicar of St Peter and St Paul, Hambledon, Hampshire. He  died on 13 March 1975.

Notes

1901 births
People educated at Shrewsbury School
Alumni of Pembroke College, Cambridge
Royal Naval Volunteer Reserve personnel of World War II
Royal Navy chaplains
Deans of Gibraltar
1975 deaths
World War II chaplains